The following is a list of the people who have served as head of the Ministry of Foreign Affairs of Colombia. Until 1886, the Ministries were named Secretariats, thus the head of the Secretariat of Foreign Affairs was titled Secretary of Foreign Affairs.

Secretaries and Ministers of Foreign Affairs

Republic of Colombia (1819—1831)

Republic of New Granada (1832—1858)

Granadine Confederation (1858—1863)

United States of Colombia (1863—1886)

Republic of Colombia (1886—present)

References

Foreign Affairs